Keinhorst is a German surname. Notable people with the surname include:

Jimmy Keinhorst (born 1990), German rugby league player
Kristian Keinhorst, German rugby league player

German-language surnames